Ester Barinaga (born 1972) is a professor of Social Entrepreneurship at Lund University (Sweden) and a professor (with special responsibilities) in the Department of Management, Politics and Philosophy (MPP) at Copenhagen Business School (CBS), Copenhagen (Denmark). She works primarily in the areas of social innovation and social entrepreneurship, with a particular emphasis on those initiatives aiming to build more inclusive and sustainable cities. Ester Barinaga was born in Spain, naturalized Swedish in 2004 and currently lives in Malmö, Sweden.

Biography 
Barinaga received a Master in Business Administration (MBA) in 1995 and a master's degree in International Management (1996) from ESADE Business School in Barcelona, Spain. From 1998 to 2002, Barinaga conducted her Ph.D. studies in Business Administration at the Stockholm School of Economics (HHS), Sweden. Her doctoral thesis was an ethnographic-inspired study of an international project group. Her doctoral thesis was awarded a three years post-doctoral scholarship from the Jan Wallanders and Tom Hedelius Foundation. The title of her Ph.D. was “Levelling Vagueness: A study of cultural diversity in an international project group”.

In 2002-2006, Barinaga worked at the Royal Institute of Technology (KTH), Stockholm, Sweden. During those years, she conducted an ethnographic study of the digital divide as it plays out in the Kista science region. This work was presented, among others, in her book “Powerful Dichotomies: Inclusion and Exclusion in the Information Society” (EFI).

Barinaga was a visiting scholar at the Graduate School of Management at University of Queensland, Brisbane, Australia in 2000, as well as at SCANCOR (Scandinavian Center for Organizational Research) in Stanford University, USA, in 2007-2008. In 2009, Barinaga became associate professor at Copenhagen Business School (CBS), Copenhagen, Denmark, at the Department of Management, Politics and Philosophy (MPP), and in 2013, she became Professor (with special responsibilities) in the same department, where she still works. In January 2019, she moved to Lund University School of Economics and Management for a Professorship of Social Innovation and Entrepreneurship.

Apart from her academic career, Ester Barinaga founded in 2010 the non-profit organization Förorten i Centrum, an initiative that uses the collective production of public art to change the stigmatized images of the so-called “immigrant suburbs” of Stockholm. Until 2020, when Förorten i Centrum closed down, the initiative coordinated the production of murals in various Swedish cities – such as Stockholm, Landskrona, Kalmar, Örebro. Her current work focuses on community currencies as a method to build more resilient communities and more inclusive cities.

Selected publication 
 Barinaga, E. 2020. A route to commons-based democratic monies? Embedding the production of money in traditional communal institutions. Frontiers in Blockchain. Here.
 Barinaga, E. 2020. Coopted! Mission-drift in a social entrepreneurial initiative engaged in a cross-sectoral partnership. VOLUNTAS: International Journal of Voluntary and Nonprofit Organizations, 31(2), 437-449
 Barinaga, E. 2014. Micro-finance in a developed welfare state: A hybrid technology for the government of the outcast. Geoforum, 51:27–36.
 Barinaga, E. 2014. Social Entrepreneurship: Cases and Concepts. Studentlitteratur.
 Barinaga, E. 2013. Politicising Social Entrepreneurship: Three Social Entrepreneurial Rationalities towards Social Change. Journal of Social Entrepreneurship, 4(3): 347–372.
 Barinaga, E. 2013. The Psychic Life of Resistance: The Ethnic Subject in a High-Tech Region. Ethnicities, 13(5):625–644.
 Barinaga, E. 2007. ’Cultural diversity’ at work: ‘National culture’ as a discourse organizing an international project group. Human Relations, 60 (2): 315–340.

External links 
 www.forortenicentrum.org

References 

Academic staff of Copenhagen Business School
1972 births
Living people
Place of birth missing (living people)
Stockholm School of Economics alumni
Danish women academics